Uttamanusorn Bridge or commonly known as Mon Bridge and Wooden Mon Bridge is a wooden footbridge in Tambon Nong Lu, Sangkhla Buri District, northwest of Kanchanaburi Province, Thailand. It spans the Songaria River.

Uttamanusorn Bridge is the longest wooden bridge in Thailand and is the second longest in the world after the Mandalay's U Bein Bridge in Myanmar.

It is named in honor of Luangpho Uttama, a Mon monk who was an abbot of Wat Wang Wiwekaram. He initiated the construction of this bridge in 1986 with local Mon workers. The bridge was completed the following year.

Uttamanusorn Bridge is considered a landmark and is one of the notable attractions of Kanchanaburi, as well as River Kwai Bridge and Death Railway, Sai Yok Noi Waterfall, and Three Pagodas Pass.

Locals walk across the bridge to make merit by giving food to monks, a daily routine.

In mid-2013, the bridge was destroyed by heavy rains and flash flooding flowing from Thung Yai Naresuan Wildlife Sanctuary. It was restored in 2014.

References

External links

Bridges completed in 1987
Bridges in Thailand
1987 establishments in Thailand
Tourist attractions in Kanchanaburi province
Wooden bridges